A sinkhole is a depression or hole in the ground caused by some form of collapse of the surface layer. The term is sometimes used to refer to doline, enclosed depressions that are locally also known as vrtače and shakeholes, and to openings where surface water enters into underground passages known as ponor, swallow hole or swallet. A cenote is a type of sinkhole that exposes groundwater underneath. Sink and stream sink are more general terms for sites that drain surface water, possibly by infiltration into sediment or crumbled rock.

Most sinkholes are caused by karst processes – the chemical dissolution of carbonate rocks, collapse or suffosion processes. Sinkholes are usually circular and vary in size from tens to hundreds of meters both in diameter and depth, and vary in form from soil-lined bowls to bedrock-edged chasms. Sinkholes may form gradually or suddenly, and are found worldwide.

Formation

Natural processes 
Sinkholes may capture surface drainage from running or standing water, but may also form in high and dry places in specific locations. Sinkholes that capture drainage can hold it in large limestone caves. These caves may drain into tributaries of larger rivers.

The formation of sinkholes involves natural processes of erosion or gradual removal of slightly soluble bedrock (such as limestone) by percolating water, the collapse of a cave roof, or a lowering of the water table. Sinkholes often form through the process of suffosion. For example, groundwater may dissolve the carbonate cement holding the sandstone particles together and then carry away the lax particles, gradually forming a void.

Occasionally a sinkhole may exhibit a visible opening into a cave below. In the case of exceptionally large sinkholes, such as the Minyé sinkhole in Papua New Guinea or Cedar Sink at Mammoth Cave National Park in Kentucky, an underground stream or river may be visible across its bottom flowing from one side to the other.

Sinkholes are common where the rock below the land surface is limestone or other carbonate rock, salt beds, or in other soluble rocks, such as gypsum, that can be dissolved naturally by circulating ground water. Sinkholes also occur in sandstone and quartzite terrains.

As the rock dissolves, spaces and caverns develop underground. These sinkholes can be dramatic, because the surface land usually stays intact until there is not enough support. Then, a sudden collapse of the land surface can occur.

Space and Planetary Bodies 
On 2 July 2015, scientists reported that active pits, related to sinkhole collapses and possibly associated with outbursts, were found on the comet 67P/Churyumov-Gerasimenko by the Rosetta space probe.

Artificial processes 

Collapses, commonly incorrectly labeled as sinkholes, also occur due to human activity, such as the collapse of abandoned mines and salt cavern storage in salt domes in places like Louisiana, Mississippi and Texas, in the United States of America. More commonly, collapses occur in urban areas due to water main breaks or sewer collapses when old pipes give way. They can also occur from the overpumping and extraction of groundwater and subsurface fluids.

Sinkholes can also form when natural water-drainage patterns are changed and new water-diversion systems are developed. Some sinkholes form when the land surface is changed, such as when industrial and runoff-storage ponds are created; the substantial weight of the new material can trigger a collapse of the roof of an existing void or cavity in the subsurface, resulting in development of a sinkhole.

Classification

Solution sinkholes
Solution or dissolution sinkholes form where water dissolves limestone under a soil covering. Dissolution enlarges natural openings in the rock such as joints, fractures, and bedding planes. Soil settles down into the enlarged openings forming a small depression at the ground surface.

Cover-subsidence sinkholes
Cover-subsidence sinkholes form where voids in the underlying limestone allow more settling of the soil to create larger surface depressions.

Cover-collapse sinkholes
Cover-collapse sinkholes or "dropouts" form where so much soil settles down into voids in the limestone that the ground surface collapses. The surface collapses may occur abruptly and cause catastrophic damages. New sinkhole collapses can also form when human activity changes the natural water-drainage patterns in karst areas.

Pseudokarst sinkholes
Pseudokarst sinkholes resemble karst sinkholes but are formed by processes other than the natural dissolution of rock.

Human accelerated sinkholes

 
The U.S. Geological Survey notes that "It is a frightening thought to imagine the ground below your feet or house suddenly collapsing and forming a big hole in the ground." Human activities can accelerate collapses of karst sinkholes, causing collapse within a few years that would normally evolve over thousands of years under natural conditions. Soil-collapse sinkholes, which are characterized by the collapse of cavities in soil that have developed where soil falls down into underlying rock cavities,  pose the most serious hazards to life and property. Fluctuation of the water level accelerates this collapse process. When water rises up through fissures in the rock, it reduces soil cohesion. Later, as the water level moves downward, the softened soil seeps downwards into rock cavities. Flowing water in karst conduits carries the soil away, preventing soil from accumulating in rock cavities and allowing the collapse process to continue.

Induced sinkholes occur where human activity alters how surface water recharges groundwater. Many human-induced sinkholes occur where natural diffused recharge is disturbed and surface water becomes concentrated. Activities that can accelerate sinkhole collapses include timber removal, ditching, laying pipelines, sewers, water lines, storm drains, and drilling. These activities can increase the downward movement of water beyond the natural rate of groundwater recharge. The increased runoff from the impervious surfaces of roads, roofs, and parking lots also accelerate man-induced sinkhole collapses.

Some induced sinkholes are preceded by warning signs, such as cracks, sagging, jammed doors, or cracking noises, but others develop with little or no warning. However, karst development is well understood, and proper site characterization can avoid karst disasters. Thus most sinkhole disasters are predictable and preventable rather than “acts of God”. The American Society of Civil Engineers has declared that the potential for sinkhole collapse must be a part of land-use planning in karst areas. Where sinkhole collapse of structures could cause loss of life, the public should be made aware of the risks.

The most likely locations for sinkhole collapse are areas where there is already a high density of existing sinkholes. Their presence shows that the subsurface contains a cave system or other unstable voids. Where large cavities exist in the limestone large surface collapses can occur, such the Winter Park, Florida sinkhole collapse. Recommendations for land uses in karst areas should avoid or minimize alterations of the land surface and natural drainage.

Since water level changes accelerate sinkhole collapse, measures must be taken to minimize water level changes. The areas most susceptible to sinkhole collapse can be identified and avoided. In karst areas the traditional foundation evaluations (bearing capacity and settlement) of the ability of soil to support a structure must be supplemented by geotechnical site investigation for cavities and defects in the underlying rock. Since the soil/rock surface in karst areas are very irregular the number of subsurface samples (borings and core samples) required per unit area is usually much greater than in non-karst areas.

In 2015, the U.S. Geological Survey estimated the cost for repairs of damage arising from karst-related processes as at least $300 million per year over the preceding 15 years, but noted that this may be a gross underestimate based on inadequate data. The greatest amount of karst sinkhole damage in the United States occurs in Florida, Texas, Alabama, Missouri, Kentucky, Tennessee, and Pennsylvania. The largest recent sinkhole in the USA is possibly one that formed in 1972 in Montevallo, Alabama as a result of man-made lowering of the water level in a nearby rock quarry.

Other areas of significant karst hazards include the Ebro Basin in northern Spain; the island of Sardinia; the Italian peninsula; the Chalk areas in southern England; Sichuan, China; Jamaica; France;Croatia; Bosnia and Herzegovina; Slovenia; and Russia, where one-third of the total land area is underlain by karst.

Occurrence 

Sinkholes tend to occur in karst landscapes. Karst landscapes can have up to thousands of sinkholes within a small area, giving the landscape a pock-marked appearance.  These sinkholes drain all the water, so there are only subterranean rivers in these areas. Examples of karst landscapes with numerous massive sinkholes include Khammouan Mountains (Laos) and Mamo Plateau (Papua New Guinea). The largest known sinkholes formed in sandstone are Sima Humboldt and Sima Martel in Venezuela.

Some sinkholes form in thick layers of homogeneous limestone. Their formation is facilitated by high groundwater flow, often caused by high rainfall; such rainfall causes formation of the giant sinkholes in the Nakanaï Mountains, on the New Britain island in Papua New Guinea. Powerful underground rivers may form on the contact between limestone and underlying insoluble rock, creating large underground voids.

In such conditions, the largest known sinkholes of the world have formed, like the  Xiaozhai Tiankeng (Chongqing, China), giant sótanos in Querétaro and San Luis Potosí states in Mexico and others.

Unusual processes have formed the enormous sinkholes of Sistema Zacatón in Tamaulipas (Mexico), where more than 20 sinkholes and other karst formations have been shaped by volcanically heated, acidic groundwater. This has produced not only the formation of the deepest water-filled sinkhole in the world—Zacatón—but also unique processes of travertine sedimentation in upper parts of sinkholes, leading to sealing of these sinkholes with travertine lids.

The U.S. state of Florida in North America is known for having frequent sinkhole collapses, especially in the central part of the state. Underlying limestone there is from 15 to 25 million years old. On the fringes of the state, sinkholes are rare or non-existent; limestone there is around 120,000 years old.

The Murge area in southern Italy also has numerous sinkholes. Sinkholes can be formed in retention ponds from large amounts of rain.

On the Arctic seafloor, methane emissions have caused large sinkholes to form.

Human uses 
Sinkholes have been used for centuries as disposal sites for various forms of waste. A consequence of this is the pollution of groundwater resources, with serious health implications in such areas.

The Maya civilization sometimes used sinkholes in the Yucatán Peninsula (known as cenotes) as places to deposit precious items and human sacrifices.

When sinkholes are very deep or connected to caves, they may offer challenges for experienced cavers or, when water-filled, divers. Some of the most spectacular are the Zacatón cenote in Mexico (the world's deepest water-filled sinkhole), the Boesmansgat sinkhole in South Africa, Sarisariñama tepuy in Venezuela, the Sótano del Barro in Mexico, and in the town of Mount Gambier, South Australia. Sinkholes that form in coral reefs and islands that collapse to enormous depths are known as blue holes and often become popular diving spots.

Local names 

Large and visually unusual sinkholes have been well known to local people since ancient times. Nowadays sinkholes are grouped and named in site-specific or generic names. Some examples of such names are listed below.

 Aven – In the south of France this name means pit cave in occitan.
 Black holes (not to be confused with cosmic black holes) – This term refers to a group of unique, round, water-filled pits in the Bahamas. These formations seem to be dissolved in carbonate mud from above, by the sea water. The dark color of the water is caused by a layer of phototropic microorganisms concentrated in a dense, purple colored layer at  depth; this layer "swallows" the light. Metabolism in the layer of microorganisms causes heating of the water. One of them is the Black Hole of Andros.
 Blue holes – This name was initially given to the deep underwater sinkholes of the Bahamas but is often used for any deep water-filled pits formed in carbonate rocks. The name originates from the deep blue color of water in these sinkholes, which is created by the high clarity of the water and the great depth of the sinkholes; only the deep blue color of the visible spectrum can penetrate such depth and return after reflection.
 Cenotes – This refers to the characteristic water-filled sinkholes in the Yucatán Peninsula, Belize and some other regions. Many cenotes have formed in limestone deposited in shallow seas created by the Chicxulub meteorite's impact.
 Sótanos – This name is given to several giant pits in several states of Mexico.
The term means sky holes in Chinese; many of this largest type of sinkhole are located in China.
 Tomo – This term is used in New Zealand karst country to describe pot holes.

Piping pseudokarst
The 2010 Guatemala City sinkhole formed suddenly in May of that year; torrential rains from Tropical Storm Agatha and a bad drainage system were blamed for its creation. A similar hole had formed nearby in February 2007.

This large vertical hole is not a true sinkhole, as it did not form via the dissolution of limestone, dolomite, marble, or any other water-soluble rock. Instead, they are examples of "piping pseudokarst", created by the collapse of large cavities that had developed in the weak, crumbly Quaternary volcanic deposits underlying the city. Although weak and crumbly, these volcanic deposits have enough cohesion to allow them to stand in vertical faces and to develop large subterranean voids within them. A process called "soil piping" first created large underground voids, as water from leaking water mains flowed through these volcanic deposits and mechanically washed fine volcanic materials out of them, then progressively eroded and removed coarser materials. Eventually, these underground voids became large enough that their roofs collapsed to create large holes.

Crown hole

A crown hole is subsidence due to subterranean human activity, such as mining and military trenches. Examples have included, instances above World War I trenches in Ypres, Belgium; near mines in Nitra, Slovakia; a limestone quarry in Dudley, England; and above an old gypsum mine in Magheracloone, Ireland.

Notable examples 

Some of the largest sinkholes in the world are:

In Africa 
 Lake Kashiba – Zambia.

In Asia
 Blue Hole – Dahab, Egypt.
 Akhayat sinkhole is in Mersin Province, Turkey.
 Well of Barhout – Yemen.
 The Baatara gorge sinkhole and the Baatara gorge waterfall next to Tannourine in Lebanon
At the bottom is an isolated patch of forest with rare species.
The Dragon Hole, located south of the Paracel Islands, is the deepest known underwater ocean sinkhole in the world.
 Shaanxi tiankeng cluster, in the Daba Mountains of southern Shaanxi, China, covers an area of nearly 5019 square kilometers with the largest sinkhole being 520 meters in diameter and 320 meters deep.
 Teiq Sinkhole (Taiq, Teeq, Tayq) in Oman is one of the largest sinkholes in the world by volume: .
 Xiaozhai Tiankeng – Chongqing, China.

In the Caribbean
 Dean's Blue Hole – Bahamas. The second deepest known sinkhole under the sea, depth . Popular location for world championships of free diving, as well as recreational diving.

In Central America
 Great Blue Hole – Belize. Unusual features are tilted stalactites in great depth, which mark the former orientation of limestone layers when this sinkhole was above sea level.
 2007 Guatemala City sinkhole
 2010 Guatemala City sinkhole

In Europe
 Hranice Abyss, in the Moravia region of the Czech Republic, is the deepest known underwater cave in the world. The lowest confirmed depth (as of 27 September 2016) is 473 m (404 m below the water level).
 Pozzo del Merro, near Rome, Italy.
 Red Lake – Croatia.
 Gouffre de Padirac – France. It is 103 m (338 ft) deep, with a diameter of 33 metres (108 ft). Visitors descend 75 m via a lift or a staircase to a lake allowing a boat tour after entering into the cave system which contains a 55 km subterranean river.
 Vouliagmeni – Greece. The sinkhole of Vouliagmeni is known as "The Devil Well", because it is considered extremely dangerous. Four scuba divers have died in it.
 Pouldergaderry – Ireland. At the level of the surrounding ground, the sinkhole covers an area of approximately 1.3 acres. Its presence is indicated on Ordnance Survey maps dating back to 1829.

In North America

Mexico
 Cave of Swallows – San Luis Potosí.  deep, round sinkhole with overhanging walls.
 Zacatón – Tamaulipas.

United States
 Bayou Corne sinkhole – Assumption Parish, Louisiana.
 The Blue Hole – Santa Rosa, New Mexico.  The surface entrance is only 80 feet (24 m) in diameter, it expands to a diameter of 130 feet (40 m) at the bottom.
 Daisetta Sinkholes – Daisetta, Texas.
Twelve springs, some more visible than others, feed a pond at the bottom.
 Golly Hole or December Giant – Calera, Alabama. Appeared 2 December 1972.
 Gypsum Sinkhole – Utah, in Capitol Reef National Park.
 Lake Peigneur – New Iberia, Louisiana.  Original depth , currently  at Diamond Crystal Salt Mine collapse.
 Winter Park Sinkhole – Winter Park, Florida. Appeared 8 May 1981. It was notable as one of the largest recent sinkholes to form in the United States. It is now known as Lake Rose.

In Oceania
 Harwood Hole – Abel Tasman National Park, New Zealand.  deep.

In South America
 Sima Humboldt – Bolívar, Venezuela. Unique, isolated forest on bottom.
 In the western part of Cerro Duida, Venezuela, there is a complex of canyons with sinkholes.

See also

References

Bibliography

External links

 US Geological Survey Water Science School page about sinkholes
Daily Telegraph slide show of 31 sinkholes
 Video of Sinkhole forming in Texas (8 May 2008)
 Google map of deepest "hole" for each state (Andy Martin)
 Tennessee sinkholes 54,000+ sinkholes

 
Road hazards
Dinaric karst formations
Natural disasters